Sir Thomas Hugh Bell, 2nd Baronet,  (10 February 1844 – 29 June 1931) was an English industrialist, landowner, Justice of the Peace, and administrator. A Deputy Lieutenant of County Durham, he was High Sheriff of Durham in 1895 and Lord Lieutenant of the North Riding of Yorkshire from 1906 to 1931. He joined his family firm, Bell Brothers, and became director of its steelworks at Middlesbrough.

Early life
The son of Isaac Lowthian Bell, when he was eighteen the young Bell was required by his father to work at the family's Bell Brothers Ironworks at Walker, Newcastle upon Tyne, but he was later educated at Edinburgh, the Sorbonne in Paris, and in Germany.

Career

After joining the family firm, Bell Brothers, Bell was made the director of the family's large factory, the steelworks at Middlesbrough. He also served as mayor of Middlesbrough three times – in 1874, 1883 and 1911. He was, like his father, a director of the North Eastern Railway, and had a private platform on the line between Middlesbrough and Redcar, at the bottom of the garden of his house, Red Barns. He was treated as royalty by the railway. His daughter, Lady Richmond, recalled saying goodbye to her father at King's Cross. He stayed with her on the platform to chat until the train left. When the train did not leave on time, they went on talking, until at last a guard came up to them and said "If you would like to finish your conversation, Sir Hugh, we will then be ready to depart."

In 1885, Bell's father was created a Baronet, a title he inherited in 1904. He was appointed a Companion of the Order of the Bath (CB) in the 1918 Birthday Honours.

He was no ordinary capitalist and mill owner, but made sure his workers were well paid and cared for.

Architectural commissions

His friendship with the architect Philip Webb led to three commissions in the Middlesbrough area – of Rounton Grange, built for his father in the 1870s and demolished in 1953, Red Barns House and the Dorman Long office building, originally that of Bell Brothers, in Middlesbrough, which was Webb's only commercial development.

Family
He was the son of the wealthy pioneering ironmaster Lowthian Bell and his wife, Margaret Pattinson. He married Maria Shield on 23 April 1867 and they had two children:
 Gertrude Bell (1868–1926), the author, traveller, and political officer
 Sir Maurice Bell, 3rd Baronet (1871–1944)

Upon the death of his first wife on 19 April 1871, he married, secondly, Florence Olliffe (later Dame Florence Bell, DBE), a daughter of Sir Joseph Olliffe.

With Florence he had three children:
 Hugh Lowthian Bell (1878–1926)
 Florence Elsa Bell (1880–1971), who married Admiral Sir Herbert Richmond
 Mary Katherine Bell, OBE (1881-1966), who married Charles Trevelyan

References

External links
 Museums in Redcar & Cleveland: Sir Thomas Hugh Bell, redcar-cleveland.gov.uk; accessed 14 April 2016.
 The Bell Family, therountons.com; accessed 14 April 2016.
 Profile, middlesbrough-live.runtime-collective.com; accessed 14 April 2016.

1844 births
1931 deaths
Baronets in the Baronetage of the United Kingdom
Companions of the Order of the Bath
Deputy Lieutenants of Durham
English justices of the peace
Fellows of the Society of Antiquaries of London
Lord-Lieutenants of the North Riding of Yorkshire
Mayors of Middlesbrough
High Sheriffs of Durham
North Eastern Railway (UK) people
Liberal Unionist Party parliamentary candidates
19th-century ironmasters